Carr Amplifiers is a Pittsboro, North Carolina, manufacturer of high-end, hand-wired tube guitar amplifiers.

Critical reception
Carr's amplifiers are praised for their workmanship and high-end components; Guitar Player said the Rambler's "layout and wiring are absolutely flawless." Russell Carlson in JazzTimes remarked on the Carr Rambler's "top-notch craftsmanship, hand-wired electronics and thoughtful, well-researched design."

The Carr amplifiers with 6L6 tubes are compared to classic Fender amps; the Slant 6V, which offers 6L6 or 6V6 power tube options also has 12AX7 and 12AT7 tubes, was praised as "an amazingly useful and versatile amp" and was a "Guitar Player Editors' Pick" in 2009. The "exceptional" Vincent was praised for "its rich tone, variable power, and compact size."

Many of Carr's amplifiers have switchable power outputs, adding to their versatility, according to professional reviews.

Carr Amplifiers were praised for having the "retro good looks of the Elvis era" while offering "crystal clear sound" in their selection as a runner up in Garden & Gun magazine's "Made in the South" 2010/2011 competition. Ed King of Lynyrd Skynyrd, John Fogerty, Joe Perry of Aerosmith, Billy Gibbons of ZZ TOP, Jorma Kaukonen Canned Heat, Jefferson Airplane, Keith Richards of the Rolling Stones, Eric Johnson, Mitch Easter, Eric Clapton, Neko Case, Kaki King, Morgan Geer, Coco Montoya, Bill Frisell, Charlie Hunter, Johann Frank, Erick Walls, Paul Simon, Joe Walsh, Eric Johnson, Rick Miller of Southern Culture on the Skids, Bob Mothersbaugh of Devo, Jay Jay French of Twisted Sister, and Jeff Tweedy and Nels Cline of Wilco own guitar amplifiers from this "boutique brand". Founder Steve Carr said of the company: "We try to figure out the great things about forties, fifties, and sixties amps and throw in some new twists. But our amps don’t have a whole lot of knobs or switches. They’re super-useful but very simple."

Models
Carr Amplifier models include:
 Mercury V (16 watts, 2 x 6V6's, Celestion Creamback M)
 Lincoln (18/6 watts, 2 x EL84's, Celestion Creamback M)
 Impala (44 watts, 2 x 6L6's, 5751, 12AT7, 2 x 12AX7, 1x12" Eminence Elsinore)
 Sportsman (19 watts, two 6V6's, three 12AX7's, one 12AT7, 1x12" Eminence "Red-White & Blues")
 Raleigh (3.5 watts, one EL-84, two 12AX7's, 1x10" Jensen Jet)
 Viceroy (formerly the Vincent) (7/33 watts, two 6L6, one 12AT7, and three 12AX7 tubes, and a 12" Eminence speaker)
 Rambler (14/28 watts, two 6L6 tubes.) 
 Slant 6V (18/22/40 watts, four 6V6 or 6L6, four 12AX7, and four 12AT7 tubes, and a 12" Eminence speaker)
 Skylark (12 watts, switchable variable attenuator 1.2 watts down to zero, two 6V6GT, two 12AX7, two 12AT7, 1x12" Celestion A Type)

Notable players
Joe Perry
Jeff Tweedy
Ed King
Jay Jay French
Eric Johnson
Nils Lofgren
John Fogerty
Jorma Kaukonen
Darrell Scott
Erick Walls
Johann Frank
Rodney Gene, Jr.
Paul Simon
Joe Walsh
Bob Mothersbaugh
Vince Gill
Rick Miller of Southern Culture on the Skids
Neko Case
Keith Richards
Billy F. Gibbons
Charlie Hunter
Bill Frisell
Will MacFarlane
Coco Montoya

References

External links
 Carr Amplifiers

Guitar amplifier manufacturers
Manufacturing companies based in North Carolina
Audio equipment manufacturers of the United States